Chaudhary Charan Singh College of Law or Chaudhary Charan Singh Vidhi Mahavidyalaya is a private law college established in 2012 adjacent to Saifai of Etawah district, Uttar Pradesh, India. It is first college of Etawah district which got approval of Bar Council of India to run LL.B. course.

Campus
It is situated inside Chaudhary Charan Singh Post Graduate College campus in Heonra (adjacent to Saifai) and is run by same management council.

Affiliation
It offers under-graduate course in law i.e. 3 year LL.B. It is affiliated to Chhatrapati Shahu Ji Maharaj University and approved by The Bar Council of India for 120 students every year in 3 year LL.B. from 2012.

References

External links
 

Memorials to Chaudhary Charan Singh
Law schools in India
Colleges affiliated to Chhatrapati Shahu Ji Maharaj University
Universities and colleges in Saifai
Law schools in Uttar Pradesh
Kanpur division
Educational institutions established in 2012
2012 establishments in Uttar Pradesh